Gajin may refer to:
 Gajin, East Azerbaijan
 Gajin, South Khorasan
 Gajin, West Azerbaijan